This list of grape varieties includes cultivated grapes, whether used for wine, or eating as a table grape, fresh or dried (raisin, currant, sultana). For a complete list of all grape species including those unimportant to agriculture, see Vitis.

The term grape variety refers to cultivars rather than actual botanical varieties according to the International Code of Nomenclature for Cultivated Plants, because they are propagated by cuttings and may have unstable reproductive properties. However, the term variety has become so entrenched in viticulture that any change to using the term cultivar instead is unlikely.

Single species grapes 

While some of the grapes in this list are hybrids, they are hybridized within a single species. For those grapes hybridized across species, known as interspecific hybrids, see the section on multispecies hybrid grapes below.

Vitis vinifera (wine)

Red grapes

White grapes

Rose grapes

Vitis vinifera (table)

Red table grapes 

 Black Corinth
 Black Monukka
 Black Rose
 Cardinal
 Mazzarrone
 Red Corinth
 Red Globe
 Valencia
 Red Flame
 Richard Walden

White table grapes 

 Agh Shani
 Calmeria
 Centennial
 Cotton Candy grapes
 Koshu
 Malingre Précoce
 Mazzarrone
 Moonballs
 Perlette
 Rozaki
 Shine Muscat
 Sugraone
 Sultana / Thompson Seedless
 Superior Seedless (Menindee Seedless)
 Valvin Muscat
 White Corinth

Vitis labrusca (wine and table) 

Many commercial varieties commonly called labrusca are actually complex interspecies hybrids.

Wine grapes 

 Campbell Early
 Catawba
 Concord
 Delaware
 Diamond
 Fredonia
 Isabella
 Ives
 Niagara
 Noah

Red table grapes 

 Canadice
 Christmas Rose
 Crimson Seedless
 Einset
 Emperor
 Flame Seedless
 Reliance Seedless
 Rouge
 Ruby Roman
 Ruby Seedless
 Swenson Red
 Tudor Premium Red
 Suffolk Red
 Vanessa
 Yates

Purple/Pink table grapes 

 Alden
 Autumn Royal
 Beauty Seedless
 Bluebell
 Buffalo
 Concord
 Coronation
 Fantasy Seedless
 Glenora
 Jupiter
 Marroo
 Mars
 Niabell
 Ribier
 Steuben
 Van Buren

Varied/Other 

 Cassady (green)
 Golden Muscat (green)
 Himrod (white)
 Interlaken (white)
 Lakemont (white)
 Marquis (white)
 Neptune (white)
 Seneca (green)

Vitis riparia (wine grape rootstock and hybridization source) 
 Riparia Gloire
 Riparia Grand Glabre
 Riparia Scribner
 Riparia Martin
 Riparia 89
 Americas

Vitis rotundifolia (table and wine) 

 Big Red (grape)
 Black Beauty (grape)
 Black Fry
 Carlos (grape)
 Cowart
 Darlene (grape)
 Dixie Red
 Early Fry
 Fry (grape)
 Granny Val
 Higgins (grape)
 Hunt
 Hunter (grape)
 Ison's
 Janebell (grape)
 Janet (grape)
 Jumbo (grape)
 Late Fry
 Magnolia (grape)
 Muscadine
 Nesbit (grape)
 Noble
 Pam (grape)
 Pineapple (grape)
 Scarlet (grape)
 Scuppernong
 Southland
 Sugargate
 Supreme (grape)
 Summit (grape)
 Sweet Jenny
 Tara (grape)
 Triumph (grape)

Vitis rupestris 
 Rupestris St. George

Vitis aestivalis (wine) 
 Norton / Cynthiana
 Black Spanish

Vitis mustangensis (table/wine/dyes) 
 Mustang Grape

Multispecies hybrid grapes

Vinifera hybrids (wine) 

Hybrid grape varieties (see Hybrid grapes) or "hybrids" is, in fact, the popular term for a subset of what are properly known as hybrids, specifically crossings between one species of the genus vitis and another. The scientific definition of a hybrid grape is any crossing (intra- or inter-specific) of two grape varieties. In keeping with the popular definition, however, the ones listed below are inter-specific hybrids where one parent is a European grape. Most of these are complex mixtures of three or more species and all parents are not always clearly known.

 Alexander
 Agawam
 Aurore
 Baco 22A (Baco blanc)
 Baco noir (Baco 1)
 Blanc du Bois
 Brianna
 Cabernet blanc
 Cabernet Cortis
 Cayuga White
 Chambourcin
 Chancellor
 Chardonel
 Chelois
 Corot noir
 Couderc noir
 Crimson Cabernet
 De Chaunac
 Edelweiss
 Elvira
 Esprit
 Flora (grape)
 Flot rouge
 Frontenac
 Goethe
 Herbert
 Kay Gray
 L'Acadie blanc
 L'Ambertille
 La Crescent
 La Crosse
 Léon Millot
 Louise Swenson
 Luci Kuhlmann
 Marechal Foch
 Marechal Joffre
 Marquette
 Massasoit
 Melody
 Merzling
 Noiret
 Onaka
 Orion
 Phoenix
 Plantet
 Prairie Star
 Ravat blanc / Ravat 6
 Ravat noir / Ravat 262
 Rayon d'Or
 Regent
 Rembrandt
 Requa
 Rondo
 Rosette
 Rougeon
 Royalty
 Rubired
 St. Croix
 St. Pepin
 Severny
 Solaris
 Sovereign Opal
 Traminette
 Triomphe d'Alsace
 Valvin muscat
 Vidal blanc
 Vignoles / Ravat 51
 Villard blanc
 Villard noir
 Zarya Severa

Vinifera hybrids (table) 
 Boskoop Glory, Vitis vinifera x Vitis labrusca
 Honey Red
 Kyoho, Vitis vinifera x Vitis labrusca
 Pione, complex hybrid 
 Rombough Seedless, Vitis labrusca x Vitis x Esprit
 Thomcord, Vitis vinifera x Vitis labrusca

Non-vinifera hybrids (table and wine) 
 Beta, Vitis labrusca X Vitis riparia
 Cascade, complex hybrid
 Clinton, Vitis labrusca X Vitis riparia
 Bordo/Ives noir, probably Vitis labrusca X Vitis aestivalis
 Jaeger 70, Vitis aestivalis and Vitis rupestris
 L'Acadie blanc, complex hybrid
 Landal noir, complex hybrid
 Landot noir, complex hybrid
 Minnesota 78, Vitis labrusca X Vitis riparia X possibly Vitis vinifera
 Muscat bleu, complex hybrid
 Seyval blanc, complex hybrid
 Seyval noir, complex hybrid

Non-vinifera hybrids (rootstock) 
 SO4, Vitis berlandieri Planch. X V. riparia Michx.
 5BB, Vitis berlandieri Planch. X V. riparia Michx.
 5C, Vitis berlandieri Planch. X V. riparia Michx.
 110R, V. berlandieri x V. rupestris
 1616 Couderc, Vitis solonis x V. riparia
 Harmony, ((V. riparia x V. labrusca) x V. vinifera) x Vitis champinii
 8909-05, Vitis rupestris ‘A. de Serres’ x Vitis rotundifolia ‘Cowart’
 3309 C, V. riparia x V. rupestris

See also 

 Annual growth cycle of grapevines
 Hybrid grape
 International variety
 Lists of cultivars
 Vitis 'Ornamental Grape', a nonflowering and nonfruiting variety

Further reading

Notes

References

External links 
 National Grape Registry (NGR)
 PlantGrape (catalogue of vines grown in France: varieties, rootstocks, clones)
Wine varietal directory 
 Most common varietal wines
 Grape varieties and Common Blends
 Grape Growers Handbook

Lists of cultivars
Wine-related lists